Donald Nickerson Smith (born 1940) is a restaurant executive for McDonald's, Burger King and other fast food franchise restaurants in the latter half of the 20th century.

Smith was Senior Executive Vice President and COO of McDonald's Corporation, before leaving to become CEO of Burger King Corporation between 1977 and 1980, then Diversifoods the largest franchisee of Burger King, later leaving for Pepsico to improve sales in Pizza Hut and Taco Bell.

Smith led the unsuccessful buyout of Diversifoods before resigning as CEO in 1985, to start a partnership with Holiday Inns Inc. and Investment Limited Partnership to form the Tennessee Restaurant Company.

Smith's business practices helped shape the modern operational procedures and advertising models for the industry.

References

American food industry business executives
Living people
1940 births
McDonald's people
Burger King people
20th-century American businesspeople